Martin Luther (1483–1546) was a German monk and theologian widely identified with the Protestant Reformation.

Martin Luther may also refer to:
 Martin Luther (diplomat) (1895–1945), German diplomat from 1940–1945 and a Nazi party member
 Martin Christian Luther (1883–1963), entrepreneur and politician from Estonia
  Martin Luther (1923 film), a German silent historical film
  Martin Luther (1953 film), a biographical film of the German priest Martin Luther
 Martin Luther (steam locomotive), a historical traction engine in Namibia

See also
 Luther (disambiguation)
 Luther Martin (1748–1826), one of the Founding Fathers of the United States
 Martin Luther Beistle (1875–1935), founder of the Beistle Company
 Martin Luther Church (disambiguation), several churches named after Martin Luther
 Martin Luther College, Minnesota
 Martin Luther King (disambiguation)
 Martin Luther King Jr. (1929–1968), American civil rights activist
 Martin Luther McCoy (born 1970), soul singer, songwriter, musician, producer and actor
 Resources about Martin Luther, a list of works by and about Martin Luther